Clara Canchanya (born 30 August 1982) is a Peruvian long-distance runner. She competed in the marathon event at the 2015 World Championships in Athletics in Beijing, China.

References

External links
 

1982 births
Living people
Peruvian female long-distance runners
Peruvian female marathon runners
World Athletics Championships athletes for Peru
Place of birth missing (living people)
20th-century Peruvian women
21st-century Peruvian women